Marco Tulio Vega Ordoñez (born 14 April 1988) is a Honduran footballer who plays as a forward who for C.D. Victoria.

Club career
Vega started his career at second division side Sonaguera and then Yoro before joining top level Marathón as their first signing in summer 2011. On August 7, 2011 he played his first game in the Honduran first division scoring his first two goals against Deportes Savio.

International career
Vega made his debut for Honduras in a September 2011 friendly match against Paraguay and has earned, as of February 2013. On 28 May 2016, Vega has played for Honduras against Argentina in an International Friendly.

References

External links

 Profile - Diez

1987 births
Living people
People from Islas de la Bahía Department
Association football forwards
Honduran footballers
Honduras international footballers
C.D. Marathón players
C.D. Real Sociedad players
F.C. Motagua players
Liga Nacional de Fútbol Profesional de Honduras players